Toros may refer to:

Sports
Rio Grande Valley FC Toros, an American soccer team in Edinburg, Texas
Austin Toros (2005-2014) a minor league basketball team from Austin, Texas
Western District Toros, a soccer club from Adelaide, South Australia

Geography
Taurus Mountains (Toros Dağları or Toroslar), a mountain range in southern Turkey
Toros (village), a village in Lukovit Municipality, Bulgaria

Other uses
TOROS artillery rocket system, a short range missile
Toros Bravo, a Spanish fighting bull
Toros Roslin (c.1210–1270), Armenian illustrator of manuscripts
Toros University, Mersin, Turkey
St. Toros Church, Jerusalem

See also
 
 Thoros (disambiguation)
 Taroç family